Bei'anhe station is a station on the Line 16 of the Beijing Subway. The station opened on December 31, 2016.

Station layout 
The station has an underground island platform.

Exits 
There are 4 exits, lettered A, B, C, and D. Exits A and C are accessible.

Transport connections

Rail
Schedule as of December 2016:

References

External links 
Bei'anhe Station – Beijing MTR Corporation Limited

Beijing Subway stations in Haidian District
Railway stations in China opened in 2016